The  is a Japanese railway line connecting Okazaki Station in Okazaki and Kōzōji Station in Kasugai, operated by the . This is the only line the company operates. Despite its name, the line is not a true loop, but a north-south line situated east of Nagoya, which can be considered as an unclosed loop (with the JR Tokaido line and Chuo Line serving as the portions of the circle).

The Aichi Loop Railway is a third sector company, with shares held by public sector such as Aichi Prefecture, the city of Toyota, and also by private companies. Unlike typical third-sector lines in Japan, the Aichi Loop Line makes a profit, since the line functions as a commuter rail line for nearby Toyota Motor factories.

Basic data
Operators, distances: 
Aichi Loop Railway (Category 1)
Okazaki - Kōzōji: 45.3 km (ca. 28.1 mi.)
Japan Freight Railway Company (Category 2)
Okazaki — Kita-Okazaki: 5.3 km (ca. 3.3 mi.)
Freight operation ceased in 1999.
Track:
Double: Naka-Okazaki - Kita-Okazaki, Kitano-Masuzuka - Mikawa-Kamigō, Mikawa-Toyota - Shin-Toyota, Setoshi - Kōzōji
Single: the rest
Railway signalling: Automatic (ATS-ST)

Services
There are no rapid services. All trains stop at every station. Three or four trains run per hour.

Station list
 All stations are located in Aichi Prefecture.
 Trains can pass each other at stations marked "◇", "^", and "v".

Rolling stock
Services are operated by a fleet of 2-car 2000 series EMUs.

History
The section between Kitano-Masuzuka and Shin-Toyota was extended and the whole line started a passenger service in 1976. 

Another part of the line, between Setoshi and Kōzōji, was originally planned as the JNR Seto Line, a (later cancelled) freight line. The Okata Line, merged with the planned Seto Line route and the link between two, was renamed the Aichi Loop Line in 1988. 

The newly founded Aichi Loop Line Company took over the line from Central Japan Railway Company (JR Central), with services starting on 31 January 1988.

From 1 October 2005, through services began over the JR Chuo Main Line to Nagoya Station.

See also
List of railway lines in Japan
Tokai Transport Service Johoku Line
Musashino Line, semi-closed outer loop around Tokyo
Osaka Higashi Line, Osaka counterpart

References

External links

  

Rail transport in Aichi Prefecture
Rail transport in Nagoya
1067 mm gauge railways in Japan
Japanese third-sector railway lines
Railway lines opened in 1988
1988 establishments in Japan